Sergio Fabian Ezequiel Agüero (born 7 April 1994) is a professional footballer who plays as a forward for Malaysia Super League club Sri Pahang. He is yet to debut for Sri Pahang since joining from KL Rovers. Born in Argentina, he plays for the Malaysian national team. He is also known as Sergio Agüero Malaysia

International career
He was called up to the Malaysian national team after obtaining citizenship in 2022.

International goals

References

External links

1994 births
Living people
Sportspeople from La Rioja Province, Argentina
Malaysian footballers
Malaysia international footballers
Argentine footballers
Argentine emigrants to Malaysia
Malaysian people of Argentine descent
Melaka United F.C. players
Association football forwards
Naturalised citizens of Malaysia
Argentine expatriate footballers
Expatriate footballers in Malaysia
Expatriate footballers in Hungary
FC Tatabánya players
Argentine expatriate sportspeople in Hungary
Argentine expatriate sportspeople in Malaysia